L'Anse-à-Valleau is a town in the municipality of Gaspé in the province of Quebec, Canada. It is located between the coastal towns of Saint-Yvon, 22 km NW, and Pointe-Jaune, 2 km SE.

References

Communities in Gaspésie–Îles-de-la-Madeleine
Gaspé, Quebec